The Bankruptcy Act 1914 (4 & 5 Geo V, c 59) was an Act of the Parliament of the United Kingdom which formed the primary source of UK insolvency law for approximately 70 years.  It came into force on 1 January 1915 repealing a number of earlier statutes.  It was substantially repealed by the short-lived Insolvency Act 1985.

The Act is generally regarded as a consolidation of earlier statutes relating to bankruptcy.

Although the Act is expressed solely with reference to the bankruptcy of individuals, section 317 of the Companies Act 1948 applied many of its provisions to corporate insolvencies.

Notes

United Kingdom Acts of Parliament 1914
Insolvency law of the United Kingdom